Rotonda West is an unincorporated, deed-restricted community situated in Charlotte County, Florida, United States. The 2020 U.S. Census Bureau lists it as the Rotonda census-designated place, with a population of 10,114. It is part of the Sarasota-Bradenton-Punta Gorda Combined Statistical Area. It was developed and named Rotonda West by Cavanagh Communities Corporation, which purchased the land in 1969.

That developer also bought land for a projected but never developed community named Rotonda East in southern Martin County and northern Palm Beach County. The land selected for that development was swamp land and it was not considered wise to drain those wetlands due to changing views on the ecological value of wetlands, and the Army Corps of Engineers refused a permit, so the Rotonda East project was abandoned. 

The area was part of ranch lands prior to development for housing in the 1970s.  Although the community's layout mimics that of temporary World War II airfields, there was no airfield at this location prior to the construction of the development; the land was instead part of a large cattle ranch.

History
The land was first part of a large cattle ranch owned by brothers William and Alfred Vanderbilt, direct descendants of Cornelius Vanderbilt. They purchased the land in 1952 and sold a portion in 1969 that became Rotonda West. The development of Rotonda West began in 1970. The layout of Rotonda West precisely mimics temporary World War II airfields in Florida, laid out like a wagon wheel. There are canals as well as streets in this development; the canals are generally parallel to the streets. Shallow craft can maneuver on the canals.

The choice of the airfield layout as the pattern for Rotonda West gives it a flavor of Florida history, however there was no airfield at this location prior to development.

This area was one of many in Florida hit by Hurricane Ian in September 2022.

Geography

Public schools
Rotonda West falls within the Charlotte County Public School district.  Two schools are adjacent to the Rotonda West area: L.A. Ainger Middle School and Vineland Elementary School. The high school located near Rotonda West is Lemon Bay High School. Both schools have received an A from the state more than five years in a row.

Center of Rotonda
There is a large park located inside the center of Rotonda West with a playground, tennis courts, and a walking path. There is also a designated area where people can pay to park boats, trailers, and RVs. There is also a water treatment plant next to the RV & Boat Parking.

Climate
Located in southwest Florida on the Gulf Coast, the weather usually stays relatively mild. In the summer, it is common for temperatures to reach the low to mid-90s, however, this is tempered by sea breezes from the Gulf. At night in the summer, temperatures quickly drop to the low to mid 70s. In the winter, hard freezes are extremely rare. It is more common to have frost on the ground briefly in pre-dawn hours in the winter season, however it quickly melts shortly after sunrise. Temperatures average 50 - 70 degrees during the winter.

Summer thunderstorms are common. The dry season is in the winter.

Demographics

As of the census of 2010, there were 8,759 people, 4,414 households, and 2,925 families residing in the CDP. There were 6,581 housing units at an average density of 618.5/mi2 (238.8/km). The racial makeup of the CDP was 97.3% White, 1.0% African American, 0.1% Native American, 0.7% Asian, 0.3% from other races, and 0.50% from two or more races. Hispanic or Latino people of any race made up 1.9% of the population.

There were 4,414 households, out of which 10.6% had children under the age of 18 living with them, 59.5% were married couples living together, 5.0% had a female householder with no husband present, and 33.7% were non-families. 19.9% of all households had someone living alone who was 65 years of age or older. The average household size was 1.98 and the average family size was 2.38.

In the CDP, the population was spread out, with 10.3% under the age of 18, 3.0% from 18 to 24, 10.3% from 25 to 44, 31.8% from 45 to 64, and 44.6% who were 65 years of age or older. The median age was 62.9 years. For every 100 females, there were 91.4 males.  For every 100 females age 18 and over, there were 89.6 males.

According to the 2017 American Community Survey, the median income for a household in the CDP was $47,586, and the median income for a family was $53,680.  The per capita income for the CDP was $28,391. About 3.1% of families and 5.5% of the population were below the poverty line, including 2.9% of those under age 18 and 4.3% of those age 65 or over.

In popular culture 
Baseball superstar Reggie Jackson, appearing at a "Superstars" television competition in Rotonda in 1977, gave a derogatory opinion of the community when he excused himself from an interview for a bathroom break: "I gotta take a Rotonda," he quipped.

References

External links
 Rotonda West Association
 Golf Courses in the Rotonda West Area

Unincorporated communities in Charlotte County, Florida
Census-designated places in Charlotte County, Florida
Census-designated places in Florida
Unincorporated communities in Florida
1970 establishments in Florida
Populated places established in 1970